Santa Cecilia is a settlement in Pueblo Rico Municipality, Risaralda Department in Colombia.

Climate
Santa Cecilia has a very wet tropical rainforest climate (Af). It is the wettest place in the department of Risaralda.

References

Risaralda Department